Scythris flavidella is a species of moth belonging to the family Scythrididae.

It is native to Central Europe.

References

Scythrididae